Parksville is a small hamlet in the town of Liberty, Sullivan County, New York, United States. The ZIP Code is 12768. It is situated at exit 98 on Route 17 (which is expected to be upgraded to Interstate 86 in the future).

History 

It is unknown the exact year that Parksville was settled, but Lemuel Martin settled there in 1800. William Parks moved there in the early 1800s. He and his son Elijah built mills and improved Parksville, and gained more respect than Martin, much to Martin's chagrin. He wanted to call it Martinville but the residents chose Parks, and the hamlet was named Parksville.
In 1880, the New York, Ontario and Western Railroad reached Parksville. It ran trains there until March 29, 1957 when the entire line was abandoned.

The hamlet was the site of the only grade intersection on the New York State Route 17 expressway east of Hancock. The intersection, labeled as exit 98, was replaced in 2012 when a new bypass was opened to the south of the existing route. Exit 98 on NY 17 is now a diamond interchange leading to Parksville's business district.

References 

Ghost towns in New York (state)
Hamlets in New York (state)
Hamlets in Sullivan County, New York